Kosov is a Russian masculine surname, its feminine counterpart is Kosova. It may refer to
Dmitry Kosov (born 1968), Russian sprinter 
Ivan Kosov (born 1999), Russian football player 
Leo Kosov-Meyer, fictional character from the Australian TV drama Sea Patrol
Sergei Kosov (born 1986), Russian football player
Yaroslav Kosov (born 1993), Russian ice hockey player

See also
Kosova (disambiguation)

Russian-language surnames